Varachha Road is one of the 182 Legislative Assembly constituencies of Gujarat state in India. It is part of Surat district and it came into existence after 2008 delimitation.

List of segments
This assembly seat represents the following segments,

 Surat City Taluka (Part) – Surat Municipal Corporation (Part) Ward No. – 28, 43, 44, 45.

Member of Legislative Assembly
2012 - Kishorbhai Kanani, Bharatiya Janata Party

Election results

2022

2017

2012

See also
 List of constituencies of Gujarat Legislative Assembly
 Gujarat Legislative Assembly

References

External links
 

Assembly constituencies of Gujarat
Surat
2008 establishments in Gujarat
Constituencies established in 2008